Naiman Banner (Mongolian:   Naiman qosiɣu) is a banner of Inner Mongolia, People's Republic of China. It is under the administration of Tongliao City,  to the northeast, and lies on China National Highway 111.

Climate

References

External links
www.xzqh.org 

Banners of Inner Mongolia
Tongliao